Melaleuca lasiandra is a plant in the myrtle family, Myrtaceae and is native to the northern inland of Australia. Its foliage is covered with soft, silky hairs giving the leaves a silvery-grey appearance and even the filaments of the stamens are hairy.

Description
They are also very densely covered with fine hairs so that they appear silvery-grey.

The flowers are yellowish green or white, and are arranged in heads at the ends of branches which continue to grow after flowering, as well as in the upper leaf axils. The stamens are arranged in five bundles around the flower, each bundle containing 6 to 20 stamens which have hairy stalks. Flowering occurs intermittently throughout the year but mostly in winter. The fruit which follow are woody capsules with the sepals forming teeth at first but are eroded later to undulations around the edge of the cup-shaped capsules.

Taxonomy and naming
Melaleuca lasiandra was first formally described in 1862 by Ferdinand von Mueller in "Fragmenta Phytographiae Australiae". The specific epithet (lasiandra) means "shaggy or woolly male", in reference to the hairy staminal filaments.

Distribution and habitat
This melaleuca occurs in the tropical north-west of Australia including the northern half of Western Australia, the Northern Territory and the central-west of Queensland. It grows in a variety of soils and vegetation associations but is common in the depressions between sand dunes.

Conservation status
Melaleuca lasiandra is listed as "not threatened" by the Government of Western Australia Department of Parks and Wildlife.

Use in horticulture
Melaleuca lasiandra is a hardy shrub for arid areas, requiring full sun and good drainage.

References

lasiandra
Myrtales of Australia
Flora of the Northern Territory
Flora of Queensland
Flora of Western Australia
Plants described in 1862
Taxa named by Ferdinand von Mueller